IFK Skövde  is a Swedish handball club from the city of Skövde, whose roots can be traced back to 1907. The current organization, however, got its shape through a reorganization in 1991. The team has been in the Handbollsligan (Swedish highest handball league) since the 1990/91 season, when it ended just outside the playoffs.

IFK Skövde has a faithful handball crowd and IFK Skövde is usually found in the top ranking of the audience in the men's highest division. They reached the Swedish Championship final in 2005, 2007, 2021 and 2022 but never won.

History 
1907 On 23 September, IFK Skövde Handbolls Club ( Idrottsföreningen Kamraternas Skövdekrets XIII ) was founded in Skövde Athletes and Sport Society at a meeting at Västra Folkeskolan in Skövde.

1975 the famous "condensation derby" was played in Division III between Skövde AIK and IFK in the Sports Hall.
The match had to be canceled when just over 1 minute was left because of the floor being too wet, due to all the condensation formed in the overflowing sports hall. A re-game could be played of which SAIK won and continued to Division II.

1976 The juniors won the Swedish junior Championship for the first time with Gunnar Blombäck as a coach.

1979 IFK won home the series in the Old Division 3

1984 The club became the winners of the series in Division 1 west before IK Sävehof, in the team was amongst others Gunnar Blombäck and Magnus Frisk. The premiere of the elite series was very good for IFK where they defeated Härnösands club Brännan. In the pre-playoffs to qualify for the highest league, they were extremely close to the elite series but lost within the last minutes against IFK Kristianstad, Gunnar Blombäck missed a penalty and Kristianstad was able to counter, won a free through and won the match by 25–24.

1987 was a milestone in the club's history when they won the Swedish Cup at home against HP Warta, which by then played in the Swedish Elite League. This year, it again became the dire loss against IFK Kristianstad in the qualifications for the Swedish Elite League.

1990 22 April is perhaps the most prominent day in the history of IFK Skövde. IFK was finally ready for Elitserien in Men's Handball Elitserien after the victory against BK Söder at home. The players were allowed to run a rev of honour in a crowded stadium.

1991 IFK Skövde was reorganized, and IFK Skövde Handboll became an independent association within IFK sports alliance.

1997 At an Elitserien in Men's Handball 1997/1998 match in Elitserien between IFK and Polisen / Söder, IFK coach Roger Carlsson Roger Ragge Carlsson suffered a heart attack and died immediately after. He is buried at Sankta Birgitta's Cemetery in Skövde. After this tragedy, former junior coach Jan Karlsson, Jan "Proppen" Karlsson, took over the role as head coach.

2001 the new Arena Skövde was opened. A very needed move but still too heavy for many IFK supporters who have experienced all the memories in the old sports hall.

2004 the team won the EHF Challenge Cup, after the final against French Dunkerque HBGL. They played in the finals in the same tournament in 1998.

2005 IFK Skövde won the Swedish elite series and went to the playoffs-final but lost to IK Sävehof.

2007 was again in the final but lost to Hammarby IF HF.

2008 the first time IFK missed the playoffs since the debut season in Elitserien 1990/91.

2009 IFK had signed Ljubomir Vranjes as a coach. Ljubomir was then persuaded to become a sports director for SG Flensburg-Handewitt but as a patch on the wounds IFK and Flensburg made an agreement which meant that the team had a certain number of friendly matches against each other plus IFK players had the chance to go to Flensburg and train with them (during certain periods).
So IFK had to contract two home profiles to the coach posts instead.
	
2021 in the final of the highest league, nowadays called Handbollsligan, for the first time since 2007 but lost to IK Sävehof

2022 they once again reached the finals, but lost to Ystads IF

Kits

Sports Hall information

Name: – Arena Skövde
City: – Skövde
Capacity: – 2500
Address: – Egnells väg 1, 541 41 Skövde

Skadevi handbollscup 
Skadevi Cup is a handball cup that was arranged in 2017 for the 41st year in a row. The cup is played every year in the all weekend hall. Participants are youth teams from Sweden, Norway and Denmark.

Coaches

Merits

Handbollsligan
Silver (2021, 2022)
Semi-final (2019)

Elitserien 
 Silver (2005, 2007)
 Semi-final (1992, 1995, 1998, 1999, 2000, 2001, 2003, 2004, 2006)

Challenge Cup 
 Gold (2004)
 Silver (1998)

EHF Cup 
 Quarter final (2005)

Youth

Junior-SM 
 Gold (1976, 1992, 1993, 1998)
 Bronze (2002, 2010)

Pojk-SM 
 Gold (2000, 2002)

References

Footnotes

External links 
 
 

Swedish handball clubs
Sport in Västra Götaland County
Idrottsföreningen Kamraterna
1907 establishments in Sweden
Handball clubs established in 1907